The National Library of Namibia (NLN) is the legal deposit and copyright library for Namibia. The library is situated in Windhoek. NLN belongs to the National Library and Archives service of the Namibian government, in the Ministry of Education, Arts and Culture.

History
The institution was established in the Tintenpalast building as the Legislative Assembly Library of South West Africa in 1926. Items from the Bibliothek des Kaiserlichen Gouvernements from the time of Imperial German colonisation were incorporated and formed the core of the initial collection. It was renamed South West Africa Administration Library in 1957. In 1960, responsibility for the library shifted from the Parliament of South Africa to the government, and the library now fell under the Ministry of Education. In 1965 it opened to the public.

In 1984 the library moved to the Estorff House nearby and was renamed Estorff Reference Library. After Namibian independence in 1990 the library was administered by the Government of Namibia, and on 1 April 1994 became the National Library of Namibia. On 20 March 2000, the eve of the 10th independence celebrations, the library moved into its current building in Eugène Marais Street in downtown Windhoek, sharing it with the National Archives of Namibia.

See also
 National Archives of Namibia
 List of national libraries

References 

 Johan Loubser (2003). National Library of Namibia. Encyclopedia of Library and Information Science
  (Includes information about the national library)

External links
 Official site

Government of Namibia
Libraries in Namibia
Namibia
Buildings and structures in Windhoek
Libraries established in 1926
Library buildings completed in 2000